Bosnia and Herzegovina competed at the 2009 Mediterranean Games held in Pescara, Italy.

Wrestling 

Greco-Roman

Nations at the 2009 Mediterranean Games
2009
Mediterranean Games